Borovskaya is a rural locality (a village) in Verkhovskoye Rural Settlement, Verkhovazhsky District, Vologda Oblast, Russia. The population was 18 as of 2002.

Geography 
Borovskaya is located 51 km southwest of Verkhovazhye (the district's administrative centre) by road. Yereminskoye is the nearest rural locality.

References 

Rural localities in Verkhovazhsky District